Eligijus is a masculine Lithuanian given name. Notable people with the name include:

Eligijus Jankauskas (born 1998), Lithuanian footballer
Eligijus Masiulis (born 1974), Lithuanian politician

See also
Eligius

Lithuanian masculine given names